Febin Joseph better known by his stage name Fejo, is an Indian rapper and songwriter from Kerala who started his solo career professionally in 2009. Rapping in Malayalam, Fejo has worked with music composers including Raftaar, Sushin Shyam, Jakes Bejoy, Rahul Raj, Girish Nakod. He is considered one of the pioneers of Malayalam Rap, noted for his socio political themes & commercially performing tracks.

He started his Indie music career in 2009 and has popularized the subversive music genres in Kerala and experimenting with different genres, predominantly Hip Hop/Rap in Malayalam. He has performed in various concerts including MTV Hustle, Comedy Utsavam, Flowers Top Singer and concerts like Breezer Vivid Shuffle, Mirchi Music Awards 2020, Para Hip Hop Fest etc.

He is best known for the theme song "Thalayude Vilayattu" from the Mohanlal starrer Aaraattu, "Aparaada Panka" from the movie Maradona starring Tovino Thomas, "Ayudhameduda" from the movie Ranam starring Prithviraj Sukumaran, "Ee Thazhvara" from the movie Athiran starring Fahad Fazil etc. He is also known for his singles "Malsaram Ennodu Thanne", "Theruvinte Kalakaran", "Avasaram Tharu", "Local Idi", "Koottilitta Thatha" ,"Vere Level" and a single with Masala Coffee - "Live the Metro Life" for KMRL.

Personal life 
Febin also known as Fejo was born to Joseph and Leonitha in Vytilla, Kochi. He has completed B.Tech. in Electrical and Electronics before entering to the movie industry.

Career
Fejo began his journey in the music/entertainment industry professionally in 2009.

He has worked with several music composers including Raftaar, Sushin Shyam, Jakes Bejoy, Rahul Raj, Masala Coffee, Girish Nakod.

In May 2018, he did his first rap for a feature film in the song Aparaada Panka for the movie Maradona starring Tovino Thomas, the song was a big hit and has crossed over 1 Million views in YouTube. In September 2018, he did rap in the song Ayudhameduda for the movie Ranam starring Prithviraj Sukumaran. Later in April 2019 he did rap in the song Ee Thazhvara from the movie Athiran starring Fahad Fazil, and in May 2019 he did rap in the song Kalathe Vellum Theeyeda from the movie Jeem Boom Bhaa starring Askar Ali.

In 2022, he made his acting debut in the movie Naaradhan directed by Aashiq Abu starring Tovino Thomas & Anna Ben.

Filmography

Feature films 
 As Rapper

As Actor

Discography

Songs featured

Television

Music and reality shows

References

External links 

  
 Fejo on Instagram
 Fejo on Youtube
 Fejo on Facebook
 Fejo at m3db.com

Indian rappers
Indian male songwriters
Living people
Year of birth missing (living people)